Jorge Alberto Costa e Silva (Vassouras, 26 March 1942) is a Brazilian psychiatrist.

He graduated from the Faculty of Medical Sciences of the State University of Rio de Janeiro in 1966.

He began his career as Assistant Professor of Psychiatry at the Faculty of Medicine of the State University of Rio de Janeiro where he became Full Professor in 1979.

From 1989 to 1992, he was president of the World Psychiatric Association.

References

1942 births
Living people
Brazilian psychiatrists
World Psychiatric Association
20th-century Brazilian physicians
People from Vassouras